Viagra Boys is a Swedish punk band from Stockholm. The band was founded in 2015 and currently consists of lead singer Sebastian Murphy, bassist Henrik Höckert, drummer Tor Sjödén, saxophonist Oscar Carls, keyboardist Elias Jungqvist and guitarist Linus Hillborg.

The band's lyrics often criticise right-wing populism, hypermasculinity and far-right conspiracy theories through the usage of satire and black humor.

History 
The band was formed in 2015, with several members coming from the bands Les Big Byrd, Pig Eyes, Nine, Nitad, and Neu-Ronz. Lead singer Sebastian Murphy is the only American-born member of the group, raised in San Francisco before moving to Sweden at the age of 17 to live with his aunt in Stockholm. A heavy drug and alcohol addict at the time, Murphy worked as a tattoo artist and met the band while performing Mariah Carey's "We Belong Together" at karaoke.

In 2018, they released their first album, Street Worms. Nils Hansson, a journalist at the newspaper Dagens Nyheter described the band favorably, praising their musical style, as well as their use of black humor and satire, and rated the album a five out of five. In 2019, the band won the Independent Music Companies Association (IMPALA) Album of the Year Award for Street Worms.

The band's second album, Welfare Jazz, was released in January 2021. Founding guitarist Benjamin Vallé died in October 2021 at the age of 47. While he played on Welfare Jazz, he was not an active member of the band at the time of his death.

The band played multiple prestigious festivals in 2022 including Coachella and Primavera Sound. Their third album, Cave World, was released in July 2022.

Members

Current members
 Sebastian Murphy – lead vocals (2015–present)
 Henrik Höckert – bass guitar (2015–present), additional vocals (2021–present)
 Tor Sjödén – drums (2015–present), additional vocals (2021–present)
 Oscar Carls – saxophone, flute, guitar (2017–present)
 Elias Jungqvist – keyboards (2019–present), additional vocals (2021–present)
 Linus Hillborg – guitar, additional vocals (2021–present)

Past members
 Benjamin Vallé – guitar (2015–2021; died 2021)
 Martin Ehrencron – synth (2015–2019)
 Rasmus Booberg – guitar (2015–2017)

Discography

Albums
 Street Worms (2018, Year0001)
 Welfare Jazz (2021, Year0001)
 Cave World (2022, Year0001)

Extended plays
 Consistency of Energy (2016, Push My Buttons)
 Call of the Wild (2017, Push My Buttons)
 Common Sense (2020, Year0001)

Live-albums
 Shrimp Sessions (2019, Year0001)
 Shrimp Sessions 2 (2021, Year0001)

Singles
 "Sports" (2018, Year0001)
 "Just Like You" (2018, Year0001)
 "Ain't Nice" (2020, Year0001)
 "Creatures" (2020, Year0001)
 "In Spite of Ourselves" (with Amy Taylor) (2020, Year0001)
 "Girls & Boys" (2021, Year0001)
 "Ain't No Thief" (2022, Year0001)
 "Troglodyte" (2022, Year0001)
 "Punk Rock Loser" (2022, Year0001)
 “Big Boy” (with Jason Williamson) (2022, Year0001)

References

External links
 
 
 

Musical groups from Stockholm
English-language singers from Sweden
Garage punk groups
Swedish punk rock groups
Swedish satirists
2016 establishments in Sweden